Weddad (lit. “Song of Hope”) is a 1936 Egyptian romantic musical film.

Weddad, also transliterated as Wydad, is based on a romantic tale inspired by Omar Khayyam's One Thousand and One Nights.  The biggest production of its time, it was the film debut of Um Kalthoum.  The film's success turned Misr Studios into the top studio in Egypt.

The sports team Wydad AC in Casablanca, Morocco, is named after the film.

Synopsis 
In the time of the Mamluk Sultanate, a rich trader named Baher has no choice but to sell his slave Wydad, who he's madly in love with, when he loses everything. But destiny will help them meet again.

Cast and crew
 Umm Kulthum
 Ahmed Allam
 Mokhtar Osman
 Mansi Fahmi
 Kouka
 Mahmoud el-Meliguy
 Yahya Nagati
 Fouad Fahim
 Fattouh Nashati

Songs
 “أيها الرائح المجد” (“O Smell of Glory”), lyrics by Sharif Al-Razi and music by Zakariyya Ahmad
 “يا بشير الأنس” (“Oh Bashir Al-Anas”), lyrics by Ahmed Rami and music by Zakariyya Ahmad
 “يا ليل نجومك شهود” (“O Night, Your Stars Are Witnesses”), lyrics by Ahmed Rami and music by Zakariyya Ahmad
 “حيّوا الربيع” (“Salute the Spring”), lyrics by Ahmed Rami and music by Riad Al Sunbati
 “على بلد المحبوب” (“In the Country of the Beloved”, sung by Abdo Al-Srouji), lyrics by Ahmed Rami and music by Riad Al Sunbati
 “ليه يا زمان كان هوايا” (“Why Was This Time a Holiday?”), lyrics by Ahmed Rami and music by Mohamed El Qasabgi
 “يا للي ودادك صفالي” (“Oh My, Your Father Is Safali”), lyrics by Ahmed Rami and music by Mohamed El Qasabgi
 “يا طير يا عايش أسير” (“O Bird, Captured Live”), lyrics by Ahmed Rami and music by Mohamed El Qasabgi

External links
 IMDb page
 El Cinema page
 El Film page

References

1936 films
Egyptian black-and-white films
1930s romantic musical films
Egyptian romantic musical films